The r-to-1 collision problem is an important theoretical problem in complexity theory, quantum computing, and computational mathematics. The collision problem most often refers to the 2-to-1 version: given  even and a function , we are promised that f is either 1-to-1 or 2-to-1. The problem then asks how many such queries we need to make to determine with certainty whether f is 1-to-1 or 2-to-1.

Classical solutions

Deterministic 

Solving the 2-to-1 version deterministically requires  queries, and in general distinguishing r-to-1 functions from 1-to-1 functions requires  queries.

This is a straightforward application of the pigeonhole principle: if a function is r-to-1, then after  queries we are guaranteed to have found a collision. If a function is 1-to-1, then no collision exists. Thus,  queries suffice. If we are unlucky, then the first  queries could return distinct answers, so  queries is also necessary.

Randomized 

If we allow randomness, the problem is easier. By the birthday paradox, if we choose (distinct) queries at random, then with high probability we find a collision in any fixed 2-to-1 function after  queries.

Quantum solution 
The BHT algorithm, which uses Grover's algorithm, solves this problem optimally by only making  queries to f.

References 

Algorithms
Polynomial-time problems